Kuzovo (Quźı) is a rural locality (a selo) in Chishminsky Selsoviet, Birsky District, Bashkortostan, Russia. The population was 444 as of 2010. There are 6 streets.

Geography 
Kuzovo is located 30 km southwest of Birsk (the district's administrative centre) by road. Aygildino is the nearest rural locality.

References 

Rural localities in Birsky District